is a legal Latin term, approximately translating to English as "of public right". An example is water in the sea. 

Many times referred to in discussion of property rights in law.

International News Service v. Associated Press, 248 U.S. 215, 234 (1918).

See also
Public domain
Res communis

References

Latin legal terminology